Vinyard may refer to:

Vineyard
Ken Vinyard (born 1947), American football player